Meer Uitgebreid Lager Onderwijs (Dutch, "more advanced primary education") was during part of the twentieth century a level of education in the Netherlands (and the Dutch East Indies), comparable with the junior high school level in the US education system. Its successors were the mavo and vbo, now both replaced by vmbo. This level of education was used up to 2021 in Suriname, when it was replaced with "voortgezet onderwijs".

In Suriname, MULO was a four year program. It was split into MULO-A which was focused on business and MULO-B which was focused on science. After graduating, students could move onto three-year VWO leading to university or a two-year HAVO leading to higher vocational training.

See also
 Education in the Netherlands

References

Education in Indonesia
Education in Suriname
Schools in the Dutch East Indies